Robert Earl Penchion (born August 11, 1949 in Town Creek, Alabama) is a former professional American football player who played in five National Football League seasons from 1972 to 1976 for the Buffalo Bills, the San Francisco 49ers and the Seattle Seahawks. He played college football at Alcorn A&M, now named Alcorn State University.

References

1949 births
Living people
People from Town Creek, Alabama
American football offensive linemen
Alcorn State Braves football players
Buffalo Bills players
San Francisco 49ers players
Seattle Seahawks players